Courtney Bernard Vance (born March 12, 1960) is an American actor. He started his career on stage before moving to film and television. And has received various accolades, including a Tony Award and two Primetime Emmy Awards, as well as nominations for a Grammy Award, Golden Globe Award, and Screen Actors Guild Award. 

Vance trained at the Yale School of Drama. He starred in the original productions of August Wilson's Fences in 1985, earning his first Tony Award nomination. He continued acting in the Broadway productions of John Guare's Six Degrees of Separation in 1990 and Nora Ephron's Lucky Guy in 2013, for which he won a Tony Award for Best Featured Actor in a Play. He is known for his roles in films such as Hamburger Hill (1987), The Hunt for Red October (1990), The Preacher's Wife (1996), Cookie's Fortune (1999), Terminator Genisys (2015), and Isle of Dogs (2018).

From 2001 to 2006 he portrayed Assistant District Attorney Ron Carver in the NBC series Law & Order: Criminal Intent. He also guest-starred on Picket Fences, Revenge, Scandal, and Masters of Sex. He won acclaim for his portrayal of Johnnie Cochran in the FX limited series The People v. O. J. Simpson: American Crime Story (2016) for which he received the Primetime Emmy Award for Outstanding Lead Actor in a Limited Series or Movie. He appeared in HBO film, The Immortal Life of Henrietta Lacks (2017), Nat Geo's limited series Genius: Aretha (2020), and the HBO series Lovecraft Country (2020) the latter earning him a Primetime Emmy Award for Outstanding Guest Actor in a Drama Series.

He has been married to actress Angela Bassett since 1997. He is on the Board of Directors of The Actors Center in New York City, and is an active supporter of Boys & Girls Clubs of America. In 2019, he was appointed president of the Screen Actors Guild Foundation.

Early life
Vance was born in Detroit, Michigan, the son of Leslie Anita, a librarian, and Conroy Vance, a grocery store manager and benefits administrator. He attended Detroit Country Day School and later graduated from Harvard University with a Bachelor of Arts degree. While at Harvard, he was already working as an actor at the Boston Shakespeare Company. He subsequently earned a Master of Fine Arts degree at Yale School of Drama, where he met fellow student and future wife Angela Bassett.

Career

1980s: Early work
In 1985, Vance started his acting career on the stage as Cory in the Yale Repertory Theatre production of August Wilson's Pulitzer Prize-winning and Tony Award for Best Play-winning play Fences. From 1987 to 1988, Vance continued the role on Broadway opposite James Earl Jones where he won a Clarence Derwent Award for his performance. He was also nominated for Tony Award for Best Featured Actor in a Play for his role.

Vance's film debut was in 1987 American war film, Hamburger Hill about the 1969 assault during the Vietnam War.

1990s: Broadway and film roles
In 1991, Vance returned to Broadway playing Paul in John Guare's Six Degrees of Separation. He acted alongside John Cunningham and Stockard Channing. He was nominated for Tony Award for Best Actor in a Play for his performance at the 45th Tony Awards.

Throughout the 1990s, Vance continued acting in a variety of feature films such as The Hunt for Red October (1990), and The Adventures of Huck Finn (1993). In 1995, Vance played Black Panther Bobby Seale in the Melvin and Mario Van Peebles docudrama Panther. That same year, he also appeared in The Last Supper and Dangerous Minds. He also worked with acclaimed directors such as Robert Altman in Cookie's Fortune, Penny Marshall in The Preacher's Wife, and Clint Eastwood in Space Cowboys.

During the 1990s, Vance guest-starred in numerous television shows including Law & Order, Picket Fences, and Thirtysomething. He also starred in made-for-television films such as Sidney Lumet's 12 Angry Men, in which he played the Foreman and acted alongside Ossie Davis, George C. Scott, Jack Lemmon, Hume Cronyn, and James Gandolfini. In 1999, Vance also starred in and co-produced the romantic comedy Love and Action in Chicago.

2000s: Television roles 
From 2001 to 2006, Vance starred in Law & Order: Criminal Intent, in which he played A.D.A. Ron Carver. He was nominated for the NAACP Image Award for Outstanding Actor in a Drama Series for his performance. In 2008 and 2009, he guest-starred in the final season of ER alongside his wife Angela Bassett. He was also in Hurricane Season.

On December 2, 2008, TV Guide reported that Vance had been cast as the Los Angeles bureau chief of the FBI in the ABC pilot FlashForward, based on a Robert J. Sawyer novel and slated to be a possible "companion show" to Lost. In 2011, he starred in the American horror film Final Destination 5. Vance was tapped for the lead in the German-American apocalypse thriller The Divide.

He appeared in the Disney Channel Original Movie Let It Shine, where he played the pastor Jacob Debarge, the main character's father, and co-starred with Tyler James Williams, Trevor Jackson, Coco Jones, Brandon Mychal Smith, and Dawnn Lewis. It was the third time Vance portrayed a pastor in a motion picture, after The Preacher's Wife and Joyful Noise).

Vance has provided the voiceover for the National Football League's "You Want the NFL, Go to the NFL" television spots.

2010s: The People v. O.J. Simpson
He appeared as Chief Tommy Delk on the TNT series, The Closer, from 2010 to 2011 (Season 6–7). Vance also played the role of Attorney Benjamin Brooks on four episodes of ABC's Revenge. In 2015, he portrayed Miles Dyson in Terminator Genisys opposite Arnold Schwarzenegger and Emilia Clarke.

He won the Tony Award for Best Featured Actor in a Play for his performance as Hap Hairston in Nora Ephron's Lucky Guy at the 67th Tony Awards (2013).

In 2016, he took on the role of Johnnie Cochran in FX's American Crime Story, which tells the story of the O. J. Simpson murder case. The series premiered on February 2, 2016, and his performance was critically acclaimed, winning Vance a Primetime Emmy Award.

In 2017, he narrated Wes Anderson's stop motion animated comedy Isle of Dogs. That same year he also starred in the HBO television film The Immortal Life of Henrietta Lacks, where he played Sir Lord Keenan Kester Cofield opposite Oprah Winfrey's Deborah Lacks.

In 2018, he appeared as Neil Beeby in the Peter Hedges film Ben Is Back, opposite Julia Roberts and Lucas Hedges. He was cast opposite Niecy Nash in Prentice Penny's feature film directorial debut, the Netflix original movie Uncorked, released in 2020.

In 2019, Vance was appointed President of the SAG-AFTRA Foundation.

In 2020, Vance was seen in HBO's drama series Lovecraft Country for which he earned a Primetime Emmy Award for Outstanding Guest Actor in a Drama Series nomination. In 2021, he appeared in National Geographic's Genius: Aretha as C. L. Franklin.

Personal life

Vance is married to Angela Bassett since October 12 1997, whom he first met in 1980. Together, they have twins, a son and a daughter, born on January 27, 2006. He and Bassett have authored a book, Friends: A Love Story, with Hilary Beard. The two also participate in the annual Christmas celebration, Candlelight Processional, at Epcot. The family lives in Los Angeles.

Vance is on the Board of Directors for The Actors Center in New York City, and is an active supporter of Boys & Girls Clubs of America. He is an alumnus of the Detroit Boys & Girls Club, and was recently inducted into the Alumni Hall of Fame for Boys & Girls Clubs of America.

On the PBS program Finding Your Roots, Vance discovered that his father was born out of wedlock to 17-year-old Victoria Ardella Vance.

Acting credits

Theatre

Film

Television

Awards and nominations

References

External links

 
 Courtney B. Vance Interview with wife Angela Bassett on Sidewalks Entertainment
 Apr 21, 2021, Terry Gross interviews Courtney B. Vance on Fresh Air

1960 births
Living people
20th-century American male actors
21st-century American male actors
African-American male actors
American male film actors
American male stage actors
American male television actors
Clarence Derwent Award winners
Detroit Country Day School alumni
Harvard University alumni
Male actors from Detroit
Outstanding Performance by a Lead Actor in a Miniseries or Movie Primetime Emmy Award winners
Tony Award winners
Yale School of Drama alumni
20th-century African-American people
21st-century African-American people